Madathiparambu is a small town and a part of Neezhoor village in Kottayam district, Kerala.

Location
It is situated approximately 4 kilometres from Kaduthuruthy, in Kottayam-Ilanji Bus route.

Landmarks
Madathipparambu Mahadeva Temple and St.Kuriakose Public School are located in Madathipparambu.

References

Villages in Kottayam district